"Aesthetics of Hate" is a song by American heavy metal band Machine Head from their sixth studio album, The Blackening. Written by vocalist and guitarist Robb Flynn, the song is a retaliation to an article written by William Grim. Grim wrote that late guitarist Dimebag Darrell was "an ignorant, barbaric, untalented possessor of a guitar", among other comments, which angered Flynn deeply enough to write the song. "Aesthetics of Hate" was nominated for Best Metal Performance at the 50th Grammy Awards.

Background
"Aesthetics of Hate" was written by Robb Flynn as a retaliation to an article by William Grim for the website Iconoclast. Titled "Aesthetics of Hate: R.I.P. Dimebag Abbott, & Good Riddance", Grim wrote the article stating Darrell was "part of a generation that has confused sputum with art and involuntary reflex actions with emotion", "an ignorant, barbaric, untalented possessor of a guitar" who looks "more simian than human".

After reading the article, Flynn was furious and wrote "Aesthetics of Hate" as a condemnation of Grim's article and Dimebag detractors. He wrote a message on the band's forum expressing his friendship with Darrell and spoke about Grim:

Recording
After "Slanderous" and "Beautiful Mourning", "Aesthetics of Hate" was the third song that was written for Machine Heads album The Blackening. Flynn originally presented it to the band as "The Thrashterpiece" which became the songs working title, because according to Flynn "it owes a huge debt to the band Exodus, [there's] a lot of Bay Area thrash worship going on in this song." In February 2005, Machine Head had penned a rough version of "Aesthetics of Hate". A 13-track November 2005 demo featured the song, although it contained what Flynn described as a "totally fucking lame 'Angel of Death' rip off. I hated it every time we played it so I was glad to see that part go!" The band entered Sharkbite Studios, in Oakland, California on August 21, 2006 to begin recording. Production duties were handled by Flynn with assistance from Mark Keaton, and mixing by Colin Richardson.

Critical reception
"Aesthetics of Hate" received positive reviews from music critics. Blabbermouth.net's Don Kaye described the track as "literally breathtaking" and said that the song "channels its title emotion into a blazing volcano of pure speed and furious guitarwork from Flynn and Phil Demmel." Reviewing for France's Hard 'N Heavy magazine, Anthrax's Scott Ian felt that the song is "a riff-o-rama showing off Robb Flynn and Phil Demmel's killer guitar work."
Thom Jurek of AllMusic felt "the intense dual arpeggios between both guitarists — Flynn and Phil Demmel on 'Aesthetics of Hate' (as just one example) are among the tightest ever". However, J.D. Considine of Blender commented that the song "cuts from screaming guitars to an ominously whispered, 'May the hands of God strike them down'. Without oversize hooks, calls for biblical vengeance just sound silly."

"Aesthetics of Hate" received a nomination for Best Metal Performance at the 50th Grammy Awards. The ceremony took place on February 12, 2008, with Machine Head being beaten out by Slayer's "Final Six". Flynn commented on the nomination, "We are completely blown away, and honored by this. It's incredible that the anger of this song has connected with so many people. It proves to Dimebag's detractors the positive impact he had on his fans and fellow bands alike."

On August 8, 2008, the song was confirmed to be as part of the "Roadrunner Records" pack in Rock Band.

Personnel
 Robb Flynn – lead vocals, rhythm guitar
 Adam Duce – bass, backing vocals
 Phil Demmel – lead guitar
 Dave McClain – drums

References

Machine Head (band) songs
2007 singles
Songs written by Robb Flynn
2007 songs
Roadrunner Records singles
Songs written by Adam Duce